Georgetown is an unincorporated community in Lewis County, West Virginia, United States. It is adjacent to Stonewall Resort State Park.

References 

Unincorporated communities in Lewis County, West Virginia
Unincorporated communities in West Virginia